The 282nd Infantry Division was an infantry division of the German Heer during World War II.

Operational history 
The 282nd Infantry Division was formed on 1 March 1943 following an order from 31 December 1942. It was created using parts of the 165th and 182nd Reserve Divisions near Cherbourg in occupied France. The staff had formerly been part of the 182nd Infantry Division. Initially, the division was subordinate to LXXXII Army Corps of 15th Army under Army Group D, the army group that oversaw the occupation of France. The division was transferred to the Eastern Front in May and became part of XXXXII Army Corps under Army Group South. By December 1943, the division was party of XXXXVII Army Corps under Army Group South's 8th Army. In January 1944, the division was reequipped as Division neuer Art 44 and was soon after strengthened with parts of the dissolved 39th Infantry Division. The division, which had joined 8th Army's XXXX Army Corps from March until April, was destroyed in August 1944 while fighting under the XXXXIV Army Corps under the 6th Army, which was part of Army Group South Ukraine. Following its destruction, the division was formally dissolved on 9 October 1944. The remaining parts of the divisions were used to replenish the forces of the 76th Infantry Division and to assist the redeployment of the 15th Infantry Division.

Noteworthy Individuals 

 Franz Karl, divisional commander from 1 March 1943.
 Wilhelm Kohler, divisional commander from 1 April 1943.
 Hermann Frenking, divisional commander from 15 August 1943.

References 

Infantry divisions of Germany during World War II
Military units and formations established in 1943
Military units and formations disestablished in 1944